The expedition against the Chinese in Montrado (1854–1855) was a punitive expedition of the Royal Netherlands Indies Army against Chinese kongsi in Montrado (Borneo).

Background
The situation after a preview Rebellion in West Kalimantan was not satisfactory for the Dutch. In May 1854, a 2,200 men strong expedition was sent to West Kalimantan led by Augustus Johannes Andresen, which had to advance to Monterado. The steam ship Celebes, Borneo and Onrust, junk Banda as well as Schooner Haai and Doris, carrying 1,700 men and artillery landed in Sambas and Pontianak. Attacks were be launched from 3 directions, Singkawang was the first to be conquered.

Battle 
Battalion XIII and half of Battalion VII landed at Bentunai, and found no resistance , while the navy was stationed at Singkawang river, and kept watch at its mouth. The journey from Bentunai to Singkawang was very difficult because of sporadic attacks from the enemy and various close quarters battles using bayonet, although in the end the Chinese were repelled. After a long march through heavy rains, Dutch troops arrived in Singkawang and the Chinese were hit from both sides and fell apart. the 18th army under Major. De Brabant raided the forts of the Chinese and Singkawang became the base for further operations.  A.J.  Andresen began issuing statements in which residents were asked to return to their homes, but the 3 Chinese kongsi refused to comply. Later, major De Brabant was sent to Lohabang (located between Singkawang and Monterado) with 2 companies;  the Chinese were disclocated from their strongholds and Fort Kulor fell on 26 May. A few days later, prominent Chinese elders from Monterado came to surrender. Hanging placards with Chinese, Malay and Dutch containing statements that resistance has been quelled and peace has been requested.  The kongsi council was declared disbanded and replaced by the Dutch;  those caught possessing weapons or ammunition were sentenced to death.  Andresen left Monterado on July 1, 1854 headed for Pontianak.

References

Sources
1900. W.A. Terwogt. Het land van Jan Pieterszoon Coen. Geschiedenis van de Nederlanders in oost-Indië. P. Geerts. Hoorn
1900. G. Kepper. Wapenfeiten van het Nederlands Indische Leger; 1816–1900. M.M. Cuvee, Den Haag.'
1876. A.J.A. Gerlach. Nederlandse heldenfeiten in Oost Indë. Drie delen. Gebroeders Belinfante, Den Haag.}

Conflicts in 1854
Conflicts in 1855
Dutch conquest of Indonesia
Borneo